Karly Piper Shorr (born May 18, 1994) is an American snowboarder.  She competed in the 2014 Winter Olympics in Sochi, Russia, where she placed sixth in women's slopestyle.

Shorr was born in Commerce Township, Michigan and graduated from Milford High School in 2012.

Karly Shorr in 2016 earning podium finishes at the Burton US Open, the Olympic test event in Pyeongchang, South Korea and the U.S. Grand Prix at Mammoth Mountain.

Career Results 
Olympic Experience

2014 Olympic Winter Games, 6th in women's slopestyle

Career Highlights

2013-14 Copper Mountain U.S. Grand Prix/World Cup, 10th

2013-14 Cardrona World Cup, 9th

Two-time 2013-14 Mammoth Mountain U.S. Grand Prix second-place finisher

2012-13 Copper Mountain U.S. Grand Prix/World Cup, 11th

2011-12 Mammoth Mountain U.S. Grand Prix, 3rd

2nd, SS, PyeongChang, KOR, 2016

Four-time U.S. Revolution Tour champion

References

1994 births
Living people
Olympic snowboarders of the United States
People from Commerce, Michigan
Snowboarders at the 2014 Winter Olympics
American female snowboarders
People from Truckee, California
21st-century American women